Friedrich Wilhelm Ernst (or Ernest) Dohm (born Elias Levy Dohm; also known by his pseudonym Karlchen Mießnick; 24 May 1819, Breslau – 5 February 1883, Berlin) was a German editor, actor, and translator.

He was Jewish and a convert to Christianity. He married the feminist Hedwig Dohm and had five children:
 Hans Ernst Dohm (1854–1866)
 (Gertrud) Hedwig (Anna) Dohm (1855–1942), married to the Jewish scientist Alfred Pringsheim
 Ida Marie Elisabeth Dohm (1856–?)
 Marie Pauline Adelheid Dohm (1858–?)
 Eva Dohm (1860–?)

He became a grandfather of the musician Klaus Pringsheim Sr. and Katharina "Katia" Pringsheim, the wife of Thomas Mann. He was a chief-editor of Kladderadatsch, a satirical magazine founded in 1848, until 1849.

See also
 Dohm-Mann family tree
 Hedwig Dohm
 Julius Rodenberg
 David Kalisch

External links

1819 births
1883 deaths
19th-century German Jews
Converts to Protestantism from Judaism
Jewish German male actors
Print editors
German male stage actors
19th-century German male actors
19th-century German translators
19th-century German writers
19th-century German male writers
German male non-fiction writers